Alice Tzeng was born on 22 April 1984. She is a Taiwanese Golden Horse Award nominated actress.

Career
Alice debuted as a model and starred in a few advertisements. She also appeared on Taiwanese entertainment show Guess Guess Guess hosted by Jacky Wu.

In 2007, she made her first movie appearance in Secret, a movie directed by Jay Chou. Alice was cast as Qing Yi, better known as 'Sky', as the supporting female actress who has a crush on the lead protagonist, Yie Xiang Lun, played by Chou. She was remarked for her sweet-looking appearance and was nominated for Best Supporting Female Actress the 44th Golden Horse Awards in 2007.

Alice has participated in a Hong Kong movie, 'L for Love, L for Lies', with co-stars Stephy Tang and Alex Fong. Since then, Gold Label Records, the production firm of the movie, has signed Alice for a number of future movies.

Alice has also starred in commercials for haircare products by Perts and Rejoice with Show Lo.

Filmography

Television series

Music videos
 "知足" MV by Mayday
 "放手" MV by Vanness Wu
 "Crazy" MV by Alan Ke
 "永久保存" MV by Jason Chan Pak Yu
 "勇敢的愛" MV by 李翊君
 2007 - "我不配" (I'm Not Worthy) MV from On the Run by Jay Chou
 2008 - "情歌王" MV as 芷苓 by Leo Ku
 "牽牽牽手" MV by Kenji Wu
 2008 - "搞笑" MV from Trendy Man by Show Lo
 "我不在乎" MV (Singing Role) by 安志杰
 "撒嬌" MV (Singing Role) by 曾愷玹

References

External links
  Secret Official Website 

1984 births
Living people
Taiwanese film actresses
Taiwanese television actresses
Actresses from Taipei
21st-century Taiwanese actresses